Javier Salas may refer to:

 Javier Salas (broadcaster), American media personality and politician
 Javier Salas (footballer) (born 1993), Mexican footballer